The 2020 Abkhazian Premier League was the 28th edition of Abkhazian Premier League organized by Football Federation of Abkhazia.

Participating Teams
This edition of the competition was attended by 10 teams:

Nart Sukhum,
Ritsa FC,
FC Dinamo Sukhum,
FC Gagra,
FC Afon,
Football Club Yertsakhu Ochamchira,
Samurzakan Gal.

The Abkhazian Premier League champion team qualifies for the Abkhazia Super Cup final and face the Abkhazian Cup champion team.

The team that won the competition was Nart Sukhum, who scored 30 points.

Final Table

Results

Round 1

Round 2

Round 3

Round 4
[Aug 19]

Samurzakan 0-2 Dinamo
     
[Aug 20]

Ritsa      3-0 Yertsakhu
  
[Aug 21]

Nart       2-1 Gagra
      
Afon       bye

Round 5
[Aug 24]

Yertsakhu  3-4 Afon
       
[Aug 25]

Gagra      8-2 Samurzakan
 
[Aug 26]

Ritsa      2-4 Nart 
      
Dinamo     bye

Round 6
[Aug 29]

Afon       0-1 Dinamo
     
[Aug 30]

Nart       3-0 Yertsakhu 
 
[Aug 31]

Samurzakan 0-3 Ritsa
      
Gagra      bye

Round 7
[Sep 3]

Yertsakhu  2-1 Dinamo
     
[Sep 4]

Gagra      4-0 Afon 
      
[Sep 5]

Nart       5-3 Samurzakan
 
Ritsa      bye

Round 8
[Sep 18]

Samurzakan 2-4 Yertsakhu
  
[Sep 19]

Gagra      0-4 Dinamo 
    
[Sep 20]

Ritsa      6-0 Afon
       
Nart       bye

Round 9
[Sep 28]

Yertsakhu  2-3 Gagra 
     
[Sep 30]

Dinamo     1-0 Ritsa 
     
[Oct 25]

Afon       0-3 Nart
       
Samurzakan bye

Round 10
[Oct 3]

Samurzakan 2-3 Afon
      
[Oct 4]

Nart       4-7 Dinamo
    
[Oct 5]

Ritsa      3-2 Gagra
     
Yertsakhu  bye

Round 11
[Oct 8]

Dinamo     6-0 Samurzakan
 
[Oct 9]

Yertsakhu  0-1 Ritsa 
     
[Oct 10]

Gagra      1-2 Nart
       
Afon       bye

Round 12
[Oct 13]

Afon       3-1 Yertsakhu
  
[Oct 14]

Samurzakan 0-4 Gagra
      
[Oct 15]

Nart       0-2 Ritsa
      
Dinamo     bye

Round 13
[Oct 18]

Dinamo     4-2 Afon
      
[Oct 19]

Ritsa      3-0 Samurzakan

[Oct 20]

Yertsakhu  1-2 Nart
      
Gagra      bye

Round 14
[Sep 29]

Samurzakan 1-2 Nart
       
[Oct 23]

Afon       0-6 Gagra
     
[Oct 24]

Dinamo     5-0 Yertsakhu
  
Ritsa      bye

Top Goalscorers

References

Football in Abkhazia